The 2013–14 Copa Federación de España was the 21st staging of the Copa Federación de España, also known as Copa RFEF, a knockout competition for Spanish football clubs in Segunda División B and Tercera División. The Copa Federación winner got the trophy and a cash prize of 90,152 euros. It also qualified for the next edition of the tournament.
The runner-up received a prize of 30,051 euros and each semifinalist 12,020 euros.

The competition began on 31 July 2013 and ended 10 April 2014. Ourense won 3–2 on aggregate over Guadalajara in the final.

Autonomous Communities tournaments

West Andalusia and Ceuta tournament

First round

Final

East Andalusia and Melilla tournament

Semifinals

Final

Aragon tournament

Quarter-finals

Semifinals

Final

Asturias tournament

Qualifying tournament

Group A

Group B

Group C

Group D

Semifinals

Final

At neutral venue

Balearic Islands tournament

First round

Semifinals

Final

Basque Country tournament

Canary Islands tournament

Final

Cantabria tournament

First round

Semifinals

Final

Castile and León tournament

Semifinals

Final

Castile-La Mancha tournament

First round

Semifinals

Final

Catalonia tournament

First round

Final

Extremadura tournament

First round

Semifinal

Final

At neutral venue

Galicia tournament

First round

Semifinals

Final

At neutral venue

La Rioja tournament

First round

Semifinals

Final

Madrid tournament

Murcia tournament

First round

Semifinals

Final

At neutral venue

Navarre tournament

First round

Group A

Group B

Final

At neutral venue

Valencian Community tournament

First round

Semifinals

Final

National phase

Qualified teams

Current champion
 Sant Andreu (Renounced to play)

Teams losing Copa del Rey first round
 R. Oviedo (Renounced to play)
 Tropezón
 Racing Ferrol
 Puerta Bonita
 At. Granadilla
 Amorebieta
 R. Unión
 Toledo
 Huracán Valencia (Renounced to play)
 Alcoyano
 Peña Deportiva
 Extremadura
 La Hoya Lorca
 El Palo
 Linense (Renounced to play)
 Guadalajara
 San Juan
 Novelda

Winners of Autonomous Communities tournaments
 Zaragoza B
 Varea
 Peña Sport
 Tenerife B
 At. Pinto
 Binissalem
 Ourense
 Almería B
 Marino
 Espanyol B
 Balmaseda
 Laredo
 At. San José
 Almansa
 Alcalá
 Yeclano
 Arandina
 Alzira

Bracket

Preliminary round 
Preliminary round was played between 6 and 13 November 2013.

First leg

Second leg

At. Pinto won 2–1 on aggregate

Round of 32 
The draw for the Preliminary round and the Round of 32 was held on October 28 at the headquarters of the RFEF.
Round of 32 was played between 20 November and 19 December 2013.

First leg

Second leg

Ourense won 5–0 on aggregate

Marino won 3–1 on aggregate

Tropezón won 6–4 on aggregate

Guadalajara won 7–5 on aggregate

At. Pinto won 7–1 on aggregate

Real Unión won 3–1 on aggregate

Balmaseda won 4–2 on aggregate

Amorebieta won 5–1 on aggregate

Novelda won 1–0 on aggregate

Alcoyano won 5–2 on aggregate

Yeclano won 2–1 on aggregate

El Palo won 3–1 on aggregate

Alcalá won 1–0 on aggregate

Zaragoza B won 3–0 on aggregate

Espanyol B won 3–2 on aggregate

Round of 16 
The draw for the Round of 16 was held on 23 December 2013 at the headquarters of the RFEF. Round of 16 was played between 8 and 23 January 2014.

First leg

Second leg

Ourense won 4–0 on aggregate

Balmaseda won 4–0 on aggregate

Alcalá won 1–1 on away goals rule

Novelda won 3–2 on aggregate

Yeclano won 3–3 on away goals rule

Guadalajara won 3–1 on aggregate after extra time

Zaragoza B won 5–3 on aggregate

R. Unión won 6–1 on aggregate

Quarter-finals 
The draw for the Quarter-finals was held on 24 January 2014 at the headquarters of the RFEF. Quarter-finals were played between 5 and 19 February 2014.

First leg

Second leg

Balmaseda won 6–5 on aggregate

Guadalajara won 4–3 on aggregate after extra time

Novelda won 4–1 on aggregate

Ourense won 7–4 on aggregate

Semi-finals 
The draw for the Semi-finals was held on 13 February 2014 at the headquarters of the RFEF. Semi-finals were played between 27 February and 5 March 2014.

First leg

Second leg

Guadalajara won 2–1 on aggregate after extra time

Ourense won 3–2 on aggregate

Final 
Final was played between 3 and 10 April 2014.

First leg

Second leg

Ourense won 3–2 on aggregate

Notes and references

External links

2013-14
3
2013–14 Segunda División B
2013–14 Tercera División